José Joaquim de Campos Leão, also known as Qorpo-Santo (Triunfo, April 19, 1829 - Porto Alegre May 1, 1883), was a Brazilian journalist and playwright. He is known to have written the very first absurdist theatre plays, long time before the term Theatre of the Absurd was coined. His family put him under judicial interdiction in 1861, because he was "writing down everything". As a matter of fact, just in May 1866 he wrote 8 plays, as noted by Guilhermino César. He looked for the best mental doctors in Brazil at that time and got a document telling he was sane, but the judge never took him out of the interdiction.

Works

1829 births
1883 deaths
Brazilian male dramatists and playwrights
19th-century Brazilian dramatists and playwrights
19th-century Brazilian male writers